Marco Antônio Gonçalves dos Santos (born December 13, 1955), better known as Skowa, is a Brazilian singer-songwriter and musician.

Biography
Skowa was born in São Paulo, on December 13, 1955; his stage name is an allusion to the Portuguese-language word for "brush", "escova", referencing his iconic afro hairstyle. As a teenager he learned how to play the classical guitar, and began to play professionally in 1975, when he would join the rock bands Sossega Leão and Premê (at the time known as "Premeditando o Breque").

In the early 1980s he collaborated with Itamar Assumpção and the new wave band Gang 90 e as Absurdettes. In 1984 he hosted two radio programs for the USP FM, Caribe 38 and Rapazes da Banda, the latter one being a talk show.

In 1987 he founded the influential soul band Skowa e a Máfia, which released two albums before disbanding in 1991 and reuniting in 2006. Skowa also took part in the 1989 tribute album to Arnaldo Baptista Sanguinho Novo... Arnaldo Baptista Revisitado, in which he covered the song "É Fácil".

Since 2003 Skowa is part of the samba rock trio Trio Mocotó, replacing founding member Fritz Escovão.

References

External links
 
 Skowa on Facebook

1955 births
Living people
21st-century Brazilian male singers
21st-century Brazilian singers
20th-century Brazilian male singers
20th-century Brazilian singers
Brazilian male guitarists
Musicians from São Paulo
Afro-Brazilian male songer-songwriters